Martha Nibley Beck (born November 29, 1962) is an American author, life coach, and speaker who specializes in helping individuals and groups achieve greater levels of personal and professional success. 

She holds three degrees, a BA, MA and PhD from Harvard University. Beck is the daughter of deceased LDS Church scholar and apologist Hugh Nibley. She received national attention after publication in 2005 of her best-seller, Leaving the Saints: How I Lost the Mormons and Found My Faith in which she recounts her experiences of surviving sexual abuse. In addition to authoring several books, Beck is a columnist for O, The Oprah Magazine.

Early life
Martha Nibley was born in Provo, Utah, in 1962, the seventh of eight children of Hugh Nibley and Phyllis Nibley, and raised LDS in a prominent Utah family. Her father was a professor at Brigham Young University. She received a  BA degree in East Asian studies, along with an MA and a PhD in sociology from Harvard University.

Career
During her academic career, Beck worked as a research associate at Harvard Business School, studying career paths and life-course changes. Before becoming a life coach, she taught sociology, social psychology, organizational behavior, and business management at Harvard and the American Graduate School of International Management. She has published academic books and articles on a variety of social science and business topics. Her non-academic books include New York Times bestsellers Expecting Adam and Leaving the Saints, as well as Finding Your Own North Star: Claiming the Life You Were Meant to Live, Steering by Starlight, and Finding Your Way in a Wild New World: Reclaiming Your True Nature, and The Way of Integrity: Finding the Path to Your True Self.

Beck has also been a contributing editor for popular magazines, including Real Simple and Redbook, and has been a columnist for O, the Oprah Magazine since July 2001. Beck is the founder of Martha Beck, Inc., which offers Wayfinder Life Coach Training, and other courses based on Beck’s philosophies.

Personal life
Beck met John Christen Beck, a fellow Mormon from Utah, during her undergraduate studies at Harvard.  They married in the LDS Salt Lake Temple on June 21, 1983, in Salt Lake City, Utah, and they eventually had three children together.

After the birth of their second child, Adam, who had been diagnosed with Down Syndrome prior to his birth, Beck returned with her husband and children to Utah to be closer to family and support.  Expecting Adam: A True Story of Birth, Rebirth and Everyday Magic is Beck's story about her decision to give birth to and raise Adam.

In 1990, soon after the birth of her third child, Beck, as a part-time faculty member at Brigham Young University (BYU) in Provo, Utah, taught a course on the sociology of gender in the Department of Social Science. During her time as part-time faculty member at BYU, five Mormon scholars were excommunicated from the LDS Church as a consequence of public writings that were deemed critical of the church; the group became known as the September Six. She and husband John Beck also made critical public statements about both the excommunications and other church and BYU matters, which led to first John, then Martha herself, leaving the LDS Church in 1993.

Since leaving the LDS Church, both Martha Beck and her now ex-husband subsequently came out publicly as gay. In 2003, Beck separated from her husband, divorcing him in 2004.  She now lives with her family in Pennsylvania.

Leaving the Saints

Beck's 2005 book Leaving the Saints: How I Lost the Mormons and Found My Faith was controversial for accusations that she was sexually abused by her father, scholar and Church of Jesus Christ of Latter-day Saints apologist Hugh Nibley, as well as stating she recovered memories of the abuse. She writes that she had forgotten the abuse until later in her life when, in 1990, she recovered them. The veracity of recovered memories is disputed, and the American Psychological Association says "there is a consensus among memory researchers and clinicians that most people who were sexually abused as children remember all or part of what happened to them," though there is also agreement among most leaders in the field, "that although it is a rare occurrence, a memory of early childhood abuse that has been forgotten can be remembered later." The allegations have been denied by Beck's mother and seven siblings. The book prompted widespread reaction, much of it within the Mormon community, and an email campaign against the book's inclusion on Oprah Winfrey's website as well as in her magazine. In her book she writes "The peculiar details of my memories had at first made me doubt myself -- they were so weird -- but in the end, reinforced my conviction that I hadn't unconsciously made something up." 

A New York Times article sums up with "Church members are also angry that Beck jokes about aspects of the Mormon faith; for example, she refers to the religious garments that Mormons wear in their temples as "holy long johns." But the main complaint about "Leaving the Saints" is that Beck has targeted one of the most admired of all the Latter-day Saints. "Books by apostates from the church, they come along all the time," Wotherspoon, of Sunstone Magazine, said. "But an attack on Hugh Nibley -- to call Hugh Nibley a pedophile and a liar, with no evidence to back it up -- of course that is going to hit the Mormon community like an earthquake."

Works
Books

 
 
 
 
 

 
 
 
 
 
  
 

Thesis

References

External links
 
 
 

1962 births
American women columnists
Former Latter Day Saints
American self-help writers
American women sociologists
American sociologists
Brigham Young University faculty
People excommunicated by the Church of Jesus Christ of Latter-day Saints
Harvard Graduate School of Arts and Sciences alumni
American lesbian writers
LGBT Latter Day Saints
LGBT people from Utah
Living people
Mormonism-related controversies
Life coaches
American women non-fiction writers
Writers from Provo, Utah